Erwann Le Péchoux (born 13 January 1982) is a French left-handed foil fencer. Le Péchoux is a four-time team European champion and four-time team world champion. A five-time Olympian, Le Péchoux is a 2016 team Olympic silver medalist and 2021 team Olympic champion. Le Péchoux competed in the 2004 Athens Olympic Games, the 2008 Beijing Olympic Games, and 2012 London Olympic Games, the 2016 Rio de Janeiro Olympic Games, and the 2021 Tokyo Olympic Games.

Le Péchoux is married to Tunisian foil fencer Inès Boubakri. Since Muslim women were forbidden to marry non-Muslim men in Tunisia until September 2017, he converted to Islam to marry her.

Medal record

Olympic Games

World Championship

European Championship

Grand Prix

World Cup

References

External links

Profile at the European Fencing Confederation

1982 births
Living people
French male foil fencers
Olympic fencers of France
Fencers at the 2004 Summer Olympics
Fencers at the 2008 Summer Olympics
Fencers at the 2012 Summer Olympics
Fencers at the 2016 Summer Olympics
People from Pertuis
Olympic medalists in fencing
Olympic silver medalists for France
Medalists at the 2016 Summer Olympics
Converts to Islam
Sportspeople from Vaucluse
World Fencing Championships medalists
Fencers at the 2020 Summer Olympics
Medalists at the 2020 Summer Olympics
Olympic gold medalists for France